Nan Hua High School (NHHS) is a co-educational government secondary school in Clementi, Singapore, offering the four-year Express course leading to the Singapore-Cambridge GCE Ordinary Level national examination.

Founded in 1917, Nan Hua High School is the tenth Special Assistance Plan (SAP) school in Singapore, and is an autonomous school since 2001. The school is also the West Zone Centre of Excellence for Chinese Language and Culture. Nan Hua High School is not affiliated with Nan Hua Primary School, despite a shared heritage.

History

Nan Hua Girls' School (1917–1955) 

Nan Hua High School was founded on 14 June 1917 as Nam Wah Girls' School, by Xiong Shangfu, an overseas Chinese industrialist and prominent figure in the local Cantonese community. The school was established with the aim to give girls in Singapore the opportunity of receiving an education which was a privilege few girls had at that time. It was first founded in a makeshift school with two rented shop-houses converted into four classrooms in Coleman Street. From a cohort of fewer than 100 Chinese girls, the student population grew rapidly and in 1921, the school moved to a new building in Bencoolen Street to accommodate its expansion. However, in 1924, the school was forced to close temporarily due to financial difficulties. After a series of public appeals, contributions of funds from the community helped pay off the school's debts, and the school re-opened.

By 1928, the Basic Teacher Training Programme had started and the student population continued to grow, leading to space constraints. In 1931, a new school building at Adis Road was ready and it became the "Main School" that ran normal training classes for teachers alongside primary classes. The old building at Bencoolen Street continued to function as a branch school offering primary classes. In 1941, Nan Hwa Girls' School was forced to cease operations as a Japanese invasion drew near. The school complex at Adis Road was turned into the headquarters for the Imperial Japanese Army shortly after the surrender of the British colonial forces.

The school re-opened in October 1945 after the return of the Allied forces. The School Management Committee (SMC) set out to raise funds to rebuild the school and enrol students. Due to the overwhelming financial support of many parents, secondary classes were set up and the school's enrolment rose to 700 pupils.

Nan Hwa Girls' High School (1956–1984)

The school's name was changed to Nan Hwa Girls' High School (simplified Chinese: 南华女子中学校; traditional Chinese: 南華女子中學校),  in December 1956. During this period, the curriculum underwent much restructuring and the school emerged as one of the premier girls' schools in Singapore. The branch school was separated from the main school to function as a primary school, with its name changed to Nan Hwa Girls' Primary School (current Nan Hua Primary School). The Main School became a secondary school after it terminated the intake of primary pupils in 1964.

Restructuring as a government school (1984–2000) 

On 12 December 1982, Nan Hwa Girls' High School moved from Adis Road to Clementi Avenue 1 on the recommendation of the Ministry of Education (MOE). The school began to admit Secondary One boys and thus became coeducational in 1984. The school was also renamed Nan Hua Secondary School, dropping the word "girls" in its name to reflect the change.

On 1 April 1986, the School Management Committee was dissolved and the school administration was handed over to the Ministry of Education, while the School Advisory Committee was formed to represent the interest of the school. This signified the change of the school from a Chinese medium school to an integrated secondary school utilising English as the medium of instruction. The move also ended the school's long-standing status as an aided school.

Attainment of SAP status (2000–present)

In the new millennium, Nan Hua Secondary School was accorded as the 10th Special Assistance Plan school. Under the Programme for Rebuilding and Improving Existing Schools (PRIME), the school relocated to a new campus at 41 Clementi Avenue 1 on 20 December 2003. The former premises was occupied by the NUS High School of Math and Science. The school subsequently attained the School of Distinction Award and Singapore Quality Class Award in 2005. The new school building was officially opened by Prime Minister Lee Hsien Loong on 17 July 2005 when he declared Nan Hua Secondary School achieving its Autonomous Status in 2006. The school's name was changed to Nan Hua High School from 1 January 2006.

In 2010, Nan Hua High School received the President's Award for the Environment, the highest environment accolade for organisations and companies in Singapore. In 2017, Nan Hua High celebrated its 100th Anniversary with a series of activities and celebrations throughout the year, culminating in the 100th Anniversary Dinner held on 15 July 2017.

Principals

School identity and culture

School crest

The white colour of the school crest embodies purity in thought, word and deed. The blue signifies essential qualities of good character, namely sincerity and integrity. The three corners of the triangle, a distinct feature for many Chinese schools, represents the moral, intellectual and physical developments of students. The widely opened book featured in the crest symbolises the school's virtue in education.

School song 
The school song is made up of two verses, one in English and one in Mandarin Chinese. In every rendition of the school song, both verses are sung, with the English verse coming first, followed by the Mandarin verse. The verse in English are written by Miss Ho Lai Lin, and the song was moderated by Chin Wai Fah. Nan Hua High School and Nan Hua Primary School have similar school songs, due to the shared heritage of both schools.

Attire and appearance 

The school uniform is a white shirt with two metal buttons at the shoulder, with the Traditional Chinese characters of the school name on it. Boys wear shirts with two front pockets at the chest fastened with two metal buttons, and it is also known as a studded shirt in the school's official website. Both shirts for boys and girls feature two shoulder flaps on each side, a unique feature of traditional Chinese schools. Traditional Chinese schools award ranks to students according to their achievement and seniority, and these shoulder flaps are used to hold epaulets denoting their ranks, much like military uniforms. Traditional Chinese schools have since abolished this system, and the shoulder flaps serve no major purpose. However, it is still retained as it symbolises Nan Hua's roots as a traditional Chinese school.

Girls with long hair have to tie their hair into two scorpions or French plaits. A rarity among most Singapore schools, the plaits are a unique part of Nan Hua's culture and is often associated with the school itself.

Campus

It consists of an admin & aesthetics block, a science block, a canteen & hall block, three classroom blocks, a foyer, an indoor sports hall, a parade square, an eco-garden and a field.

The administration & aesthetics block mainly houses the general office, staff room and dedicated rooms and studios for the Performing Arts CCAs. A sky garden, a classroom based on an "open classroom" concept on the 5th floor of the same block was opened by then Minister for Education, Tharman Shanmugaratnam on 25 April 2007. The sky garden was the culmination of a variety of proposals put forth by students after a challenge issued to them by then Principal Dr Foo Suan Fong to come up with ideas to transform the space into one which could be used not only for casual meetings, but also for lessons and CCAs. The auditorium, named after the school's top donor, the Yeung Ching Foundation, is also located on the same level as the sky garden.

Academic information

O Level express course 
Nan Hua High School offers the four-year Express course which leads up to the Singapore-Cambridge GCE Ordinary Level national examination. To build cross-cultural capabilities in a multi-racial society, Nan Hua also offers promising students the opportunity to study Malay under the Malay Special Programme (MSP).

Academic subjects 
The examinable academic subjects for Singapore-Cambridge GCE Ordinary Level offered by Nan Hua High School for Upper Secondary level (via. streaming in Secondary 2 level), as of 2017, are listed below.

Notes:
 Subjects indicated with ' * ' are mandatory subjects.
 All students in Singapore are required to undertake a Mother Tongue Language as an examinable subject, as indicated by ' ^ '.
 "SPA" in Pure Science subjects refers to the incorporation of School-based Science Practical Assessment, which 20% of the subject result in the national examination are determined by school-based practical examinations, supervised by the Singapore Examinations and Assessment Board. The SPA Assessment has been replaced by one Practical Assessment in the 2018 O Levels.
Science
 Additional Mathematics*
 Mathematics*
 Physics (SPA)
 Chemistry (SPA)*
 Biology (SPA)
Language & Literature
 English Language*
 Literature in English
 Chinese Language* ^
 Higher Chinese Language
 Literature in Chinese
 Malay (Special Programme)
Humanities
 Geography
 History
 Combined Humanities (Social Studies & History Elective/Geography Elective)*
Arts & Aesthetics
 Higher Art
 Design & Technology
 Food & Consumer Education

SAP Flagship Programme 
The SAP Flagship Programme (a programme offered at SAP schools) at Nan Hua High School is revolves around Chinese Culture and Bi-cultural Studies. Being the only SAP high school directly under the government, the programme is fully governed under the Ministry of Education, as opposed to independent and government-aided schools.

The flagship programme comprises two elements and five key components. The elements of classical thoughts and culture is brought forth through appreciation of Chinese Culture as well as Confucianism ideals. The programme also covers life-skills such as translation.

Alumni

Nan Hua Alumni Association 
Nan Hua Alumni Association was established in 1998, as a platform to reconnect alumni and preserve the school spirit. Nan Hua. The alumni body is made up of two wings, the main wing and the youth wing.

Notable alumni 

 Don Wee: Member of Parliament for Chua Chu Kang GRC
 He Ying Ying: Actress, Mediacorp
 Hong Junyang: Singer and host; Runner-up, Project SuperStar 2005
 Ann Nicole Ng: Radio DJ, 987FM

External links

 School Website
 Nan Hua Alumni Association

References

Secondary schools in Singapore
Autonomous schools in Singapore
Educational institutions established in 1917
Clementi
1917 establishments in British Malaya